Zacharias Hackzell  (March 1, 1751, in Tornio, Lapland, Finland – August 20, 1804, Finland) worked as the chief of police (Swedish: kronolänsman) for the Swedish crown in Tornio, Finland.

Childhood

Zacharias was one of the five children born to Anders Mårtensson Hackzell (1705–1757) and Anna Catharina Plantin (1663–1741), of which three were sons (one died at birth) and two were daughters.

The father of Zacharias, Anders Hackzell, worked as the chief enforcement officer (Swedish: kronofogde), a cartographer and a mapper (Swedish: lantmätare) for the Swedish crown.  Two weeks before his sixth birthday of Zacharias, his father had died on February 13, 1757.

Marriage and career

Zacharias married twice.  The first wife of Zacharias, Anna Margareta Grape, died at the age of 29 in 1785.  Zacharias later married to Agata Pipping (1766–1833), the daughter of the mayor of Tornio, Peter Pipping.  Zacharias and Agata gave birth to one child - a son -, Olov Gustav Hackzell, in the year 1800 in Övertorneå, Sweden, located by the modern-day border between Sweden and Finland.

Following in the footsteps of both his father Anders Hackzell and grandfather Mårten Hackzell, Zacharias too chose to work for the Swedish crown.  Zacharias became the chief of police (Swedish: kronolänsman) for the Swedish crown in Tornio, at the border of the modern-day countries of Sweden and Finland.  At the time, Finland was still a part of the Realm of Sweden.  Five years after the death of Zacharias in 1809, Finland became an autonomous Grand Duchy of Russia (1809–1917).

See also 
 Burestenen
 Genealogia Sursilliana

Sources

 Slott och herresäten i Sverige – Uppland (II).
 Svenska män och kvinnor – by Bonniers förlag, 1954.
 Svensk uppslagsbok – a Swedish encyclopedia published between 1929 and 1955 in two editions.
 Det medeltida Sverige 1:6 ("The Medieval Sweden").
 Vapenbok ("Book of Coats of Arm") by passagen.se.

References

1751 births
1804 deaths
People from Tornio